Speed are a five-piece Australian hardcore punk band.

History
Jem formed Speed with his brother Aaron in 2019 shortly after the dissolution of Endless Heights, a band in which he played lead guitar.
 
In October 2019, Speed released a demo EP on Last Ride Records and signed a deal with Flatspot Records for the US release.
 
In June 2020, the band released the two-track single, 2020 Flex., preceded by the single, "A Dumb Dog Gets Flogged" which the vocalist said, "...was born in reaction to the failed leadership of our government during the 2019-2020 Australian bushfires. Empathy and compassion should always be the premise for meaningful action."
 
In June 2021, the band released "We See U" as part of the hardcore punk compilation, This Is Australia Vol 2.
 
In May 2022, the band announced the release of Gang Called Speed as their official debut EP, alongside its lead single "Not That Nice" which addresses Asian hate crimes. They said, "Even though this is our first EP, [we're] sort of approaching it almost like a debut album. That's why it's called Gang Called Speed – this is the identity of the band. This is what we're all about. This is Australian hardcore." Gang Called Speed was released on 24 June 2022 and debuted at number 5 on the ARIA Charts.

Discography

EPs

Demo albums

Singles

References

Musical groups established in 2019